Miyu Kato and Makoto Ninomiya were the defending champions but chose to participate with different partners. Kato played alongside Storm Sanders, but they lost in the first round to Gabriela Dabrowski and Caroline Garcia. Ninomiya partnered Eri Hozumi, but lost in the quarterfinals to Nadiia Kichenok and Abigail Spears.

Chan Hao-ching and Latisha Chan won the title, defeating Hsieh Su-wei and Hsieh Yu-chieh in the final, 7–5, 7–5.

Seeds

Draw

Draw

References

External Links
Draw

Toray Pan Pacific Open - Doubles
2019 Doubles
2019 Toray Pan Pacific Open